DYRM-DTV (channel 26) is a television station in Iloilo City, Philippines, owned and operated by Broadcast Enterprises and Affiliated Media, Inc. The station maintains a transmitter facility along Piña-Tamborong-Alaguisoc Road, Brgy. Alaguisoc, Jordan, Guimaras, at the former Globe cell site.

History
It was started as Cinema Television (or CTV-26) in 1995. It was also the first UHF station to be inspired by a movie television. And on year 1997, it had its broadcast rights form E!, an American-cable network channel that features fashion and lifestyle show, which is lately known as E! Philippines. But in the year 2003 RMN decided to cancel its operation to TV network, citing financial constraints and poor ratings.

On July 3, 2011, UHF 26 in Iloilo and all RMN TV stations nationwide returned as a test broadcast, as the frequency was occupied by Broadcast Enterprises and Affiliated Media, following the latter was bought up by Bethlehem Holdings, Inc. (funded by Globe Telecom's Group Retirement Fund) from RMN. And then on it was branded as BEAM Channel 26 and The Game Channel on August 15, 2011. Recently, The Game Channel limited to its broadcast on December 24, 2011, to give way to its new sister station CHASE which it was broadcast in evening block of The Game Channel. Recently The Game Channel leased its operation on BEAM and transferred its operation to cable, while CHASE remains on this network and took its 24‑hour broadcast. On September 7, 2012, an animation plug appears on BEAMtv and CHASE and written as: Another Jack TV is rising, soon on this channel. The station was rebranded as Jack City, the station was planned and officiated its launch on October 20, 2012, while CHASE ended its broadcast on October 19. But it lessened its on air limits on free TV to 18 hours a day, due to National Telecommunications Commission's guidelines on free-to-air broadcasters, however it continues broadcasting 24/7 on cable networks. Somehow it ended operations and affiliation partnership with BEAM on August 31, 2014, and was moved to cable networks. Currently BEAM Channel 26 Iloilo, along with other BEAM TV stations nationwide is currently affiliated with Essentials Broadcasting Network thru TBN Asia and O Shopping (an ABS-CBN-owned shopping network channel).

BEAM TV provincial stations ceased its analog transmission on March 29, 2022 (3 months after BEAM TV 31 Manila closed down its analog signal for the second time on January 1, 2022), as its now fully migrated to digital broadcast permanently. As of March 30, 2022 (a day after its analog shutdown), BEAM TV Digital broadcast started to operate on UHF 26, but still under maintenance as the network still trying to migrate its signal operations which is currently using the digital transmission on UHF 42 in the area. On April 6, 2022, BEAM TV announced launched of PIE, a new channel that co-ownership with ABS-CBN Corporation, Kroma Entertainment and 917Ventures, on May 23, 2022 as the all-new "tradigital" entertainment channel

Digital television

Digital channels

DYRM-DTV currently operates on UHF Channel 26 (545.143 MHz) and is multiplexed into the following subchannels:

Areas of coverage

Primary areas 
 Iloilo City
 Iloilo
 Guimaras

Secondary areas 
 Bacolod
 Portion of Negros Occidental

Television stations in Iloilo City
Television channels and stations established in 1995
Digital television stations in the Philippines